Hector Bertram Gray  (6 June 1911 – 18 December 1943) was an officer of the Royal Air Force, and a member of the British Army Aid Group, who was posthumously awarded the George Cross for "most conspicuous gallantry" in resisting torture after the Japanese occupation of Hong Kong in 1941.

Early life
Gray was born on 6 June 1911 in Gillingham, Kent the son of Lionel and Adela (née Duff) Gray, his father was a musician. Gray joined the Royal Air Force as an aircraft apprentice at RAF Halton.

Long distance flight
In November 1938 Gray, then a Sergeant Pilot with the RAF Long Range Development Flight, was acting as a radio operator/mechanic in one of three Vickers Wellesley bombers that flew non-stop for two days from Ismailia, Egypt to Darwin, Australia (7,162 mi/11,525 km) setting a world distance record. The Wellesley's record remained unbroken until November 1945 but it remains the longest by a single engined aircraft. Gray was awarded the Air Force Medal for the flight.

British Army Aid Group
Gray smuggled medicine into the prisoner of war camp to help the many seriously ill prisoners incarcerated there and was a conduit for news from the outside world. When the Japanese grew suspicious he was tortured and interrogated for six months but refused to divulge the names of fellow officers, such as Captain Douglas Ford of the Royal Scots, and Colonel Lanceray Arthur Newnham of the Middlesex Regiment. He was executed by firing squad, with fellow prisoners, on 18 December 1943 and buried in Stanley Military Cemetery in Hong Kong. Notice of his award was published in the London Gazette on 19 April 1946.

Honours and awards
28 April 1939 Sergeant Hector Bertram Gray of the Royal Air Force Long Range Development Unit was awarded the Air Force Medal in recognition of services rendered to crews of two aircraft which flew from Ismailia to Port Darwin in November 1938 on world's long-distance record flight.
19 April 1946 Flight Lieutenant Hector Bertram Gray AFM is posthumously awarded the George Cross "in recognition of most conspicuous gallantry in carrying out hazardous work in a very brave manner".

References

Royal Air Force officers
British recipients of the George Cross
Royal Air Force recipients of the George Cross
Recipients of the Air Force Medal
People executed by Japan by firing squad
Royal Air Force personnel killed in World War II
1911 births
1943 deaths
Executed British people
20th-century executions by Japan
People from Gillingham, Kent
Executed people from Kent
British torture victims
World War II prisoners of war held by Japan
British World War II prisoners of war
Burials at Stanley Military Cemetery
Military personnel from Kent